Riverview is an unincorporated community in Keya Paha County, Nebraska, United States.

History
Riverview was named from its scenic setting upon the Niobrara River.

A post office was established at Riverview in 1912, and remained in operation until it was discontinued in 1957.

References

Unincorporated communities in Keya Paha County, Nebraska
Unincorporated communities in Nebraska